Monument is a compilation album by Canadian industrial band Front Line Assembly, released in 1998. It was re-released on July 30, 2007 through Polish label Metal Mind. The track "Monument" appeared in its original version on the 1993 album Phaze Two of Bill Leebs and Rhys Fulbers side project Intermix. The booklet of the 2007 re-release contains an outline of the band history.

Track listing

Personnel

Front Line Assembly
 Bill Leeb – engineering (1), mixing (1)
 Rhys Fulber – production, programming
 Michael Balch – engineering (2), mixing (2)

Additional musicians
 Jeff Stoddard – guitar (5)

Technical personnel
 Greg Reely – editing (2, 4, 12), engineering (3–12), mixing (3–10, 12), mastering
 Anthony Valcic – engineering (1), mixing (1)
 Paul Kendall – remixing (11)
 Anne Marie Damjanovic – project coordination
 Dave McKean – design, photography, illustration
 Max McMullin – 3D programming

References

Front Line Assembly compilation albums
1998 compilation albums
Albums with cover art by Dave McKean
Roadrunner Records compilation albums
Electro-industrial compilation albums
Albums produced by Rhys Fulber